Ziraki  is a village and the capital of Raghistan District in Badakhshan Province in northeastern Afghanistan.

References

Populated places in Badakhshan Province
Villages in Afghanistan